Tanja Karišik-Košarac (née Karišik; born July 23, 1991) is a cross-country skier and biathlete from Bosnia and Herzegovina who has competed since 2009. She finished 72nd in the 10 km event at the 2010 Winter Olympics in Vancouver, and 65th in the 10 km event at the 2018 Winter Olympics in Pyeongchang.

Her lone career finish was at a 5 km event in Bosnia and Herzegovina in 2009.

Her husband is Nemanja Košarac, another Bosnian biathlete.

References

IBU profile
2018 PyeongChang profile

1991 births
Biathletes at the 2010 Winter Olympics
Biathletes at the 2014 Winter Olympics
Bosnia and Herzegovina female biathletes
Bosnia and Herzegovina female cross-country skiers
Cross-country skiers at the 2010 Winter Olympics
Cross-country skiers at the 2014 Winter Olympics
Cross-country skiers at the 2018 Winter Olympics
Living people
Olympic cross-country skiers of Bosnia and Herzegovina
Olympic biathletes of Bosnia and Herzegovina
Serbs of Bosnia and Herzegovina